Emanuel di Pasquale is an American poet and translator.

Life
His work has appeared in The Journal of Orgonomy American Poetry Review, Sewanee Review, New York Quarterly, and the New York Times.

He lives in East Brunswick, New Jersey.

Awards
 2000 Raiziss/de Palchi Translation Awards
 1998 Bordighera Poetry Prize, Song of the Tulip Tree, by Joe Salerno

Works

Poetry

Translations

Anthologies

References

Year of birth missing (living people)
Living people
American male poets
Italian–English translators
20th-century American poets
20th-century American translators
20th-century American male writers
21st-century American poets
21st-century American translators
21st-century American male writers
People from East Brunswick, New Jersey
Poets from New Jersey